Juan Matías Fischer (born February 12, 1985 in Junín, Buenos Aires Province, Argentina) is an Argentine footballer currently playing for Atlético Camioneros of the Torneo Argentino B of Argentina.

Teams
  Boca Juniors 2004
  Bolivar 2005
  Nueva Chicago 2006
  Chacarita Juniors 2007
  Almirante Brown 2007-2008
  Sarmiento 2008-2010
  Deportivo Español 2010-2011
  Estudiantes de Mérida 2011
  Unión Temuco 2012
  Talleres 2013
  Atlético Camioneros 2013–present

References
 
 

1985 births
Living people
Argentine footballers
Argentine expatriate footballers
Boca Juniors footballers
Nueva Chicago footballers
Chacarita Juniors footballers
Club Atlético Sarmiento footballers
Club Bolívar players
Unión Temuco footballers
Club Almirante Brown footballers
Deportivo Español footballers
Estudiantes de Mérida players
Talleres de Remedios de Escalada footballers
Argentine Primera División players
Bolivian Primera División players
Venezuelan Primera División players
Primera B de Chile players
Expatriate footballers in Chile
Expatriate footballers in Bolivia
Expatriate footballers in Venezuela
Association football forwards